Carvel William "Bama" Rowell (January 13, 1916 – August 16, 1993) was an American professional baseball player. In Major League Baseball, he was a second baseman and outfielder for the Boston Bees/Braves (1939–41 and 1946–47) and Philadelphia Phillies (1948). Rowell was a native and lifelong resident of Citronelle, Alabama.

He finished 21st in voting for the  National League Most Valuable Player for playing in 130 games and having 486 at bats, 46 runs scored, 148 hits, 19 doubles, eight triples, three home runs, 58 runs batted in, 12 stolen bases, 18 walks, .305 batting average, .331 on-base percentage, .395 slugging percentage, 192 total bases and three sacrifice hits.

In six MLB seasons Rowell played in 574 games and had 1,901 at bats, 200 runs scored, 523 hits, 95 doubles, 26 triples, 19 home runs, 217 runs batted in, 37 stolen bases, 113 walks, a .275 batting average, a .316 on-base percentage, and a .382 slugging percentage, with 727 total bases and 27 sacrifice hits.

On May 30, 1946 at 4:25 P.M., Rowell hit a home run which broke the Bulova clock on the Ebbets Field scoreboard, shattering the clock's glass. The clock stopped exactly one hour later.  Although Bulova promised a free watch to anyone who hit the clock, Rowell didn't receive his watch until 41 years later, on Bama Rowell day in Citronelle.

On March 6, 1948, Rowell was involved in a key trade for the Braves. He was swapped to the Brooklyn Dodgers with first baseman Ray Sanders and $40,000 for second baseman Eddie Stanky. Although Rowell spent only eleven days with Brooklyn before being sold to the Phillies on March 17, Stanky helped lead Boston to its first National League pennant since .

References

External links

 

1916 births
1993 deaths
Baseball players from Alabama
Boston Bees players
Boston Braves players
Cocoa Indians players
Cordele Reds players
Dayton Ducks players
DeLand Red Hats players
Hartford Bees players
Louisiana State University alumni
Major League Baseball second basemen
Major League Baseball left fielders
Minneapolis Millers (baseball) players
Minor league baseball managers
Mobile Bears players
People from Mobile County, Alabama
Philadelphia Phillies players
Winston-Salem Twins players